Martin Elias Peter Seligman (born August 12, 1942) is an American psychologist, educator, and author of self-help books. Seligman is a strong promoter within the scientific community of his theories of positive psychology and of well-being. His theory of learned helplessness is popular among scientific and clinical psychologists. A Review of General Psychology survey, published in 2002, ranked Seligman as the 31st most cited psychologist of the 20th century.

Seligman is the Zellerbach Family Professor of Psychology in the University of Pennsylvania's Department of Psychology. He was previously the Director of the Clinical Training Program in the department, and earlier taught at Cornell University. He is the director of the university's Positive Psychology Center. Seligman was elected president of the American Psychological Association for 1998. He is the founding editor-in-chief of Prevention and Treatment (the APA electronic journal) and is on the board of advisers of Parents magazine.

Seligman has written about positive psychology topics in books such as The Optimistic Child, Child's Play, Learned Optimism, Authentic Happiness and Flourish. His most recent book, The Hope Circuit: A Psychologist's Journey from Helplessness to Optimism, was published in 2018.

Early life and education
Seligman was born in Albany, New York to a Jewish family. He was educated at a public school and at The Albany Academy. He earned a bachelor's degree in philosophy at Princeton University in 1964, graduating summa cum laude. He turned down a scholarship to study analytic philosophy at Oxford University, and animal experimental psychology at the University of Pennsylvania, and accepted an offer to attend the University of Pennsylvania to study psychology. He earned a Ph.D. in psychology from University of Pennsylvania in 1967. On June 2, 1989, Seligman received an honorary doctorate from the Faculty of Social Sciences at Uppsala University, Sweden.

Learned helplessness

Seligman's foundational experiments and theory of "learned helplessness" began at University of Pennsylvania in 1967, as an extension of his interest in depression. Quite by accident, Seligman and colleagues discovered that the experimental conditioning protocol they used with dogs led to behaviors which were unexpected, in that under the experimental conditions, the recently conditioned dogs did not respond to opportunities to learn to escape from an unpleasant situation.  Seligman developed the theory further, finding learned helplessness to be a psychological condition in which a human being or an animal has learned to act or behave helplessly in a particular situation—usually after experiencing some inability to avoid an adverse situation—even when it actually has the power to change its unpleasant or even harmful circumstance. Seligman saw a similarity with severely depressed patients, and argued that clinical depression and related mental illnesses result in part from a perceived absence of control over the outcome of a situation. In later years, alongside Abramson, Seligman reformulated his theory of learned helplessness to include attributional style.

Happiness
In his 2002 book Authentic Happiness, Seligman saw happiness as made up of positive emotion, engagement and meaning.

Positive psychology
Seligman worked with Christopher Peterson to create what they describe as a "positive" counterpart to the Diagnostic and Statistical Manual of Mental Disorders (DSM). While the DSM focuses on what can go wrong, Character Strengths and Virtues (2004) is designed to look at what can go right. In their research they looked across cultures and across millennia to attempt to distill a manageable list of virtues that have been highly valued from ancient China and India, through Greece and Rome, to contemporary Western cultures. Their list includes six character strengths: wisdom/knowledge, courage, humanity, justice, temperance, and transcendence. Each of these has three to five sub-entries; for instance, temperance includes forgiveness, humility, prudence, and self-regulation. The authors do not believe that there is a hierarchy for the six virtues; no one is more fundamental than or a precursor to the others.

Well-being
In his book Flourish, 2011, Seligman wrote on "Well-Being Theory", and said, with respect to how he measures well-being:

Each element of well-being must itself have three properties to count as an element:

 It contributes to well-being.
 Many people pursue it for its own sake, not merely to get any of the other elements.
 It is defined and measured independently of the other elements.

He concluded that there are five elements to "well-being", which fall under the mnemonic PERMA:

 Positive emotion—Can only be assessed subjectively
 Engagement—Like positive emotion, can only be measured through subjective means. It is presence of a flow state
 Relationships—The presence of friends, family, intimacy, or social connection
 Meaning—Belonging to and serving something bigger than one's self
 Achievement—Accomplishment that is pursued even when it brings no positive emotion, no meaning, and nothing in the way of positive relationships.

These theories have not been empirically validated.

In July 2011, Seligman encouraged the British Prime Minister, David Cameron, to look into well-being as well as financial wealth in ways of assessing the prosperity of a nation. On July 6, 2011, Seligman appeared on Newsnight and was interviewed by Jeremy Paxman about his ideas and his interest in the concept of well-being.

MAPP program 
The Master of Applied Positive Psychology (MAPP) program at the University of Pennsylvania was established under the leadership of Seligman as the first educational initiative of the Positive Psychology Center in 2003.

Personal life
Seligman plays bridge and finished second in the 1998 installment of one of the three major North American pair championships, the Blue Ribbon Pairs, as well as having won over 50 regional championships.

Seligman has seven children, four grandchildren, and two dogs. He and his second wife, Mandy, live in a house that was once occupied by Eugene Ormandy. They have home-schooled five of their seven children.

Seligman was inspired by the work of the psychiatrist Aaron T. Beck at the University of Pennsylvania in refining his own cognitive techniques and exercises.

Publications
  (Paperback reprint edition, W.H. Freeman, 1992)
   (Paperback reprint edition, Penguin Books, 1998; reissue edition, Free Press, 1998)
  (Paperback reprint edition, Ballantine Books, 1995)
  (Paperback edition, Harper Paperbacks, 1996)
  (Paperback edition, Free Press, 2004)

See also
 List of Jewish American psychologists

References

External links

 Authentic Happiness, Seligman's homepage at University of Pennsylvania
 "Eudaemonia, the Good Life: A Talk with Martin Seligman", an article wherein Seligman speaks extensively on the topic of eudaemonia
 "The Positive Psychology Center", a website devoted to positive psychology. Martin Seligman is director of the Positive Psychology Center of the University of Pennsylvania.
 Program description for Master of Applied Positive Psychology degree established by Seligman
 Martin E. P. Seligman's curriculum vitae at the University of Pennsylvania
 TED Talk: Why is psychology good?
 University of Pennsylvania's page on MAPP program
 

1942 births
20th-century American psychologists
21st-century American psychologists
American contract bridge players
American self-help writers
Animal testing
Fellows of the American Association for the Advancement of Science
Fellows of the Society of Experimental Psychologists
Jewish American writers
Living people
Positive psychologists
Presidents of the American Psychological Association
Princeton University alumni
Social psychologists
The Albany Academy alumni
University of Pennsylvania alumni
University of Pennsylvania faculty
21st-century American Jews